Robert Scott Mills was Dean of Dunedin from 1973 until 1991.

Mills was educated at the University of New Zealand and ordained in 1960.  He was a curate at St Stephen, Westminster from 1955 to 1960.  After a curacy at Whangarei he was Chaplain to the Bishop of Nelson. He was Vicar of Welling from 1960 to 1965; Dean of Dunedin from 1965 to 1973; Vicar of Blockhouse Bay from 1969 to 1973.

Notes

Deans of Dunedin

University of New Zealand alumni
Year of birth missing
Year of death missing